TC-2216 is a drug developed by Targacept which acts as a partial agonist at neural nicotinic acetylcholine receptors and was researched for the treatment of anxiety and depression. It was unsuccessful as a therapeutic but is still used in pharmacological research as an alpha4beta2-selective antagonist.

References 

Nicotinic agonists
3-Pyridyl compounds
Spiro compounds